The KitKatClub is a nightclub in Berlin, opened in March 1994 by Austrian pornographic filmmaker Simon Thaur and his life partner Kirsten Krüger.

Overview

The KitKatClub is known for its sexually uninhibited parties. Guests are allowed to engage in sexual intercourse openly at the venue. The motto of the club is "Do what you want but stay in communication". Patrons are diverse, including heterosexuals and members of the LGBT+ community.

A strict dress code is applied for entry at the door, often enforced by Kirsten Krüger herself, and requiring fetish, latex, leather, kinky, high style, and glamour. The venue consists of three dance floors and an outdoor area with a pool. It is decorated with ultra-violet light and fluorescent colour paintings by the Berlin-based painter Vigor Calma aka "Der Träumer" (the dreamer).

Nowadays, the emphasis in the club is more on music and dancing than on sexual activities.

The club has moved three times since its opening in 1994. It opened in Glogauer Straße in the Kreuzberg district in the former Turbine. In 1999 it moved to Neues Schauspielhaus at Nollendorfplatz, and in 2001 to another lot in the district Tempelhof (which became part of Schöneberg in 2000) in Bessemer Straße. At the beginning of July 2007, it moved to the SageClub in the Mitte district at Brückenstraße 1.

When the KitKat opened its doors in 1994 the musical profile of the club was mainly classical trance mixed with goa trance, but through the years the club has opened up to a wider selection of electronic music. A KitKat record label was founded in 2005 and two CDs were released, Hedonistic Nightlife in Berlin and The Piep Show Compilation #0.

The KitKatClub Berlin celebrated its 20th anniversary on March 1, 2014. At that time a novel about the early years of KitKat was published under the same name KitKatClub, written by Vigor Calma. In 2019, a new edition of the novel appeared under the title Rausch in Berlin (German language only).

After the closing and the loss of any income due to the COVID-19 pandemic, the KitKatClub set up a website to support the club and transmit streams live from the location. The club started offering COVID-19 tests in December 2020.

Name origin
The name KitKatClub is inspired by the frivolous Berliner nightclub featured in the American musical Cabaret. Harold Prince's Cabaret was set in Berlin in the early 1930s, against the backdrop of the ascent of the Nazi party, at a burlesque theatre called the "Kit Kat Club". The name originated from the Kit-Cat Club, an 18th-century English liberal political society.

See also
List of electronic dance music venues
Sex positive

References

External links 
  KitKatClub's official website
 streaming-site
  KitKatClub DVD booklet (English/Deutsch – PDF) 1994–2005 – History of the KitKatClub by Kirsten.
  KitKatClub@Myspace
  KitKat-photo gallery – Opening @ sageclub July 2007
  Read KitKatClub's reviews on Berlin-Life.com
  „Die Bühne ist der Star“ – about the KitKatClub, by Henning Kober, die tageszeitung (taz), 28. Feb. 2004
  „Erlaubt ist, was gefällt“ – by Elmar Schütze, Berliner Zeitung vom 3. Mai 2001
  "Locker trotz SM" – S&M view about the KitKatClub
  KitKatClub @ Alter Wartesaal (Köln)
  KitKatClub @ clubguideberlin

1994 establishments in Germany
Electronic dance music venues
Nightclubs in Berlin
Sex businesses